Petar Metličić (born 25 December 1976) is a retired Croatian handball player. He was captain of the Croatian national team from 2006 to 2009, after the departure of Slavko Goluža. He won the gold medal at the 2004 Summer Olympics in Athens as well as at the 2003 World Championship in Portugal.

At club level he played in the top tier in Croatia, Spain, Slovenia and France. He has won the EHF Champions League three times and the EHF Champions Trophy twice with BM Ciudad Real as well as the IHF Super Globe and EHF Cup Winner's Cup with CB Ademar León, and the EHF Cup with RK Metković Jambo.

In September 2007 he opened, alongside his former colleague Ivano Balić, the "Balić-Metličić" handball academy. Metličić is also a coach in the academy.

From February 2015 to January 2017  he served as an assistant coach to Željko Babić in the Croatia men's team.

Honours

Player
Brodomerkur Split
Croatian First A League
Runner up (2): 1996–97, 1997–98
Croatian First B League - South
Winner (1): 1994–95

Metković Jambo 
Croatian First League 
Winner (1): 2001–02 (revoked)
Croatian First A League 
Winner (3): 1998–99, 1999–00, 2000–01
Croatian Cup 
Winner (2): 2001, 2002
EHF Cup 
Winner (1): 2000
Finalist (1): 2001

Ademar Leon
EHF Cup Winner's Cup
Winner (1): 2005
Supercopa ASOBAL
Finalist (1): 2003

Ciudad Real
Liga ASOBAL 
Winner (4): 2006–07, 2007–08, 2008–09, 2009–10
Runner up (1): 2005–06
Copa del Rey 
Winner (1): 2008
Finalist (2): 2006, 2009
Copa ASOBAL
Winner (3): 2006, 2007, 2008
Finalist (1): 2010
Supercopa ASOBAL 
Winner (1): 2008
Finalist (2): 2009, 2010
EHF Champions League 
Winner (3): 2005–06, 2007–08, 2008–09
EHF Champions Trophy 
Winner (2): 2006, 2008
IHF Super Globe 
Winner (2): 2007, 2010

Pivovarna Laško Celje
1. NLB Leasing liga
Runner up (1): 2011–12
Slovenian Cup 
Winner (1): 2012

Montpellier 
LNH Division 1
Runner up (1): 2012–13
Coupe de la France 
Winner (1): 2013

Individual
Best Croatian handball player by Sportske novosti & HRS – 2003
Franjo Bučar State Award for Sport – 2004

Orders
 Order of Danica Hrvatska with face of Franjo Bučar – 2004

References

External links
 Stats
 Best Croatian handball players, coaches and referee's
 
 
 
 

1976 births
Living people
Sportspeople from Split, Croatia
Croatian male handball players
Olympic handball players of Croatia
Handball players at the 2004 Summer Olympics
Handball players at the 2008 Summer Olympics
Olympic gold medalists for Croatia
Liga ASOBAL players
BM Ciudad Real players
CB Ademar León players
Olympic medalists in handball
Medalists at the 2004 Summer Olympics
Mediterranean Games gold medalists for Croatia
Competitors at the 2001 Mediterranean Games
Mediterranean Games medalists in handball